George Paul Miller (February 18, 1868November 26, 1930) was an American businessman and Republican politician.  He was a member of the Wisconsin State Senate, representing Dane County during the 1901 and 1903 sessions.

Biography
George Miller was born in Sheboygan Falls, Wisconsin, in February 1868.  He was raised and educated there, graduating from Sheboygan Falls High School and going on to attend Ripon College, in Fond du Lac County, Wisconsin.

He moved to Madison, Wisconsin, in 1891 and established the Miller Lumber Company, a manufacturing and lumber-dealing business.  He quickly became involved in local politics and was elected president of the Republican League Club in 1896, and chairman of the Republican City Committee of Madison in 1897.

He was elected to the Wisconsin State Senate in 1900, running in the 26th Senate district, which then comprised all of Dane County.  He served a four year term and was not a candidate for re-election in 1904.

Subsequently, he became involved in the relatively new automobile business and established a dealership in Madison in partnership with Emil Hokanson—one of the first such dealerships in Dane County.

He moved to Chicago about 1919, and was president of the Marmon Sales Company for most of the rest of his life.  He retired in 1930, and died at his home in Richwoods Township, Peoria County, Illinois, on November 26, 1930.

Personal life and family
George P. Miller was one of at least three children born to Phillip Miller and his wife Marie ( Duhogue).  George Miller married Ann Lee in 1892 and had three children.  At his death, he left an estate worth about 1.4 million dollars to his children (about 25 million dollars adjusted for inflation).

Electoral history

Wisconsin Senate (1900)

| colspan="6" style="text-align:center;background-color: #e9e9e9;"| General Election, November 6, 1900

References

External links
 

1868 births
1930 deaths
Ripon College (Wisconsin) alumni
People from Sheboygan Falls, Wisconsin
Businesspeople from Madison, Wisconsin
Republican Party Wisconsin state senators
20th-century American politicians